The Thomas Viaduct spans the Patapsco River and Patapsco Valley between Relay, Maryland and Elkridge, Maryland, USA. It was commissioned by the Baltimore and Ohio Railroad (B&O); built between July 4, 1833, and July 4, 1835; and named for Philip E. Thomas, the company's first president. Some claim it to be the world's oldest multiple arched stone railroad bridge. However, the Sankey Viaduct on the Liverpool and Manchester Railway was opened in 1830, and finally completed in 1833.

At its completion, the Thomas Viaduct was the largest railroad bridge in the United States and the country's first multi-span masonry railroad bridge to be built on a curve. In 1964, it was designated as a National Historic Landmark. In 2010, the bridge was designated as a National Historic Civil Engineering Landmark by the American Society of Civil Engineers.

The viaduct is now owned and operated by CSX Transportation and still in use today, making it one of the oldest railroad bridges still in service.

Design
This Roman-arch stone bridge is divided into eight spans. It was designed by Benjamin Henry Latrobe, II, then B&O's assistant engineer and later its chief engineer. The main design problem to overcome was that of constructing such a large bridge on a curve. The design called for several variations in span and pier widths between the opposite sides of the structure. This problem was solved by having the lateral pier faces laid out on radial lines, making the piers essentially wedge-shaped and fitted to the 4-degree curve.

The viaduct was built by John McCartney of Ohio, who received the contract after completing the Patterson Viaduct. Caspar Wever, the railroad's chief of construction, supervised the work.

The bridge is constructed using a rough-dressed Maryland granite ashlar from Patapsco River quarries, known as Woodstock granite.
The viaduct contains  of masonry and cost $142,236.51, equal to $ today.

History

The Baltimore and Ohio Railroad was one of the oldest railroads in the United States. Construction began on July 4, 1828, with the original route following the upper branch of the Patapsco River which led west to Ellicott's Mills (later renamed Ellicott City) from the lower Patapsco which is the "Basin" (now Inner Harbor) at downtown Baltimore and the Baltimore Harbor and Port of the lower river estuary leading southeast 15 miles to flow into the Chesapeake Bay. (See Baltimore Terminal Subdivision and Old Main Line Subdivision.) In 1835 the Washington Branch was constructed, including the Thomas Viaduct. This new line branched at Relay, the site of a former post road hotel and changing point for stage horses. The 1830s Relay House served as a hotel until it was replaced by the $50,078.41 (equal to $ today) Viaduct Hotel in 1872. The Gothic combination railroad station and hotel operated until 1938 and was torn down in 1950.

When the Thomas Viaduct was completed, a  obelisk with the names of the builder, directors of the railroad, the architect (engineer) and others associated with the viaduct was erected at the east end in Relay, by builder John McCartney. On one side the monument reads: The Thomas Viaduct, Commenced July 4, 1833 Finished, July 4, 1835. He also celebrated the completed work by having his men kneel on the deck of the viaduct while mock "baptizing" them with a pint of whiskey.

Until after the American Civil War, the B&O was the only railroad into Washington, D.C., thus the Thomas Viaduct was essential for supply trains to reach the capital of the Union during that conflict. To prevent sabotage, the bridge was heavily guarded by Union troops stationed along its length.

In 1929, extensive mortar work on the masonry was carried out, and again in 1937. To counteract deterioration of the masonry, the Thomas Viaduct underwent more cosmetic upgrades in 1938 performed by the B&O Maintenance of Way Department. The work consisted primarily to improve facilities for drainage, relocation of loose arch ring stones and the application of a grout mixture to the stone spandrels filling. Nevertheless, the bridge is still indicative of the way in which the B&O track and major structures were put down in the most permanent manner possible. At an unknown date, railing blocks were removed from the north side of the deck and a bracketed walkway added giving more lateral clearance. Little work had been done on the viaduct until the repairs of 1937–1938 which, according to a 1949 report by the Chief Engineer of the B&O, would keep future maintenance to a minimum.

From the 1880s to the 1950s, Thomas Viaduct carried B&O's famed Royal Blue Line passenger trains between New York and Washington. Until the late 1960s, the bridge also carried B&O passenger trains traveling to points west of Washington, such as the Capital Limited to Chicago and the National Limited to St. Louis.

With the advent of Amtrak on May 1, 1971, B&O ended its passenger train service, except for local Baltimore–Washington commuter trains. In 1986, CSX acquired the B&O and all of its trackage, including the Thomas Viaduct. Today, MARC's "Camden Line" train service runs daily trains over the Viaduct. See Capital Subdivision.

During design and construction, the Thomas Viaduct was nicknamed "Latrobe's Folly" after the designer Benjamin Latrobe II, because at the time many doubted that it could even support its own weight. Contrary to these predictions, the Thomas Viaduct survived the great flood of 1868 as well as Hurricane Agnes in 1972, two floods that wiped out the Patapsco Valley and destroyed nearly everything in their path; and to this day it continues to carry 300-ton (270 tonne) diesel locomotives passengers and heavy freight traffic.

The bridge was designated a National Historic Landmark on January 28, 1964, and administratively listed on the National Register of Historic Places on October 15, 1966.  In 2010, the bridge designated as a National Historic Civil Engineering Landmark by the American Society of Civil Engineers.

In 2014 and 2015, the non-profit historic preservation organization Preservation Howard County placed the Viaduct on its list of the top 10 endangered historic places in Howard County. The Patapsco Heritage Greenway group announced plans to add handrails to the bridge in 2015.

See also

Hockley Forge and Mill Industrial development around viaduct
Patterson Viaduct - one of John McCartney's earlier works.
Bloede dam - a historical hydroelectric dam located within the same park as the Thomas Viaduct.
List of bridges documented by the Historic American Engineering Record in Maryland
List of bridges on the National Register of Historic Places in Maryland
List of Howard County properties in the Maryland Historical Trust

References and footnotes

External links

National Historic Landmark information
The Thomas Viaduct At Relay Maryland at archive.org

 - includes 1978 photo
Rasmussen, Frederick N. "Thomas Viaduct celebrates its 175th anniversary in July," The Baltimore Sun, Saturday, June 19, 2010.
American Society of Civil Engineers landmark information

Many historic and contemporary photos and images of the Thomas Viaduct

Baltimore and Ohio Railroad bridges
Bridges completed in 1835
Crossings of the Patapsco River
Railroad bridges on the National Register of Historic Places in Maryland
CSX Transportation bridges
Historic Civil Engineering Landmarks
National Historic Landmarks in Maryland
Railroad bridges in Maryland
Viaducts in the United States
Bridges in Baltimore County, Maryland
Bridges in Howard County, Maryland
Historic American Engineering Record in Maryland
Elkridge, Maryland
History of rail transportation in the United States
Railroad-related National Historic Landmarks
National Register of Historic Places in Baltimore County, Maryland
Stone arch bridges in the United States
1835 establishments in Maryland